Hetschkia is a monotypic genus of Brazilian comb-footed spiders containing the single species, Hetschkia gracilis. It was first described by Eugen von Keyserling in 1886, and is found in Brazil.

See also
 List of Theridiidae species

References

Monotypic Araneomorphae genera
Spiders of Brazil
Taxa named by Eugen von Keyserling
Theridiidae